Cadet was an American Christian alternative rock band from Eugene, Oregon, and they formed in 2000 and disbanded in 2004, while their frontman was Ryan Smith. They released, Cadet, with BEC Recordings, in 2001. The same label released, The Observatory, in 2002.

Background
The Christian alternative rock band formed in Eugene, Oregon, in 2000. Their members were lead vocalist and lead guitarist, Ryan Smith, guitarist, keyboardist, and background vocalist, Matt Lenhart, bassist and background vocalist, Jason Kennedy, drummer and background vocalist, Chad Basom. They disbanded as a group, in 2004.

Music history
The group was formed in 2000, with their major label released studio album, Cadet, was released by BEC Recordings, on April 24, 2001. Their subsequent studio album, The Observatory, was released on October 8, 2002, by BEC Recordings.

Members
Members
 Ryan Smith – lead vocals, lead guitar
 Matt Lenhart – guitar, keys, background vocals
 Jason Kennedy – bass, background vocals 
 Chad Basom – drums, background vocals

Discography
Studio albums
 Cadet (April 24, 2001, BEC)
 The Observatory (October 8, 2002, BEC)

References

External links
 Cross Rhythms artist profile
 New Release Tuesday artist profile

Musical groups established in 2000
Musical groups disestablished in 2004
Musical groups from Eugene, Oregon
BEC Recordings artists